The Niagara Falls Flyers were two junior ice hockey franchises that played in the top tier in the Ontario Hockey Association. The first, a Junior "A" team existed from 1960 until 1972, and the second in Tier I Junior "A" from 1976 until 1982.

Both teams were owned by the Emms Family, and were relocated to Niagara Falls from another city. The Niagara Falls Memorial Arena was home ice to both teams.

History

The first Flyers team relocated to Niagara Falls from Barrie in 1960. The team was affiliated with the Boston Bruins of the NHL. The Flyers appeared in three Memorial Cups in the 1960s, winning in 1965 and 1968.

1963 Memorial Cup
Niagara Falls won the right to play for the Cup by defeating the Toronto Neil McNeil Maroons for the OHA championship, and the Espanola Eagles to win the George Richardson Memorial Trophy as eastern Canadian representatives.

The Flyers were runners up to the Memorial Cup in 1963 played at Edmonton's Arena Gardens. They lost in six games to the Edmonton Oil Kings in a best-of-seven series. Flyers players Dornhoefer and Harmer both suffered broken legs while on the ice.

1965 Memorial Cup
Niagara Falls won the right to play for the Cup by defeating the defending champions Toronto Marlboros for the OHA championship. The Memorial Cup in 1965 was again played at Edmonton's Arena Gardens. They defeated the Oil Kings 4 games to 1 in a best-of-seven rematch series from two years previous. The series was filled with brawls and suspensions, as well as a heavy police presence throughout.

1968 Memorial Cup
Niagara Falls won the right to play for the Cup by defeating the Kitchener Rangers for the OHA championship, and the Verdun Maple Leafs for the eastern championship.

The 1968 Memorial Cup featured two Boston Bruins farm teams playing one another. The Flyers would play the Estevan Bruins on home ice, except for game two at the Montreal Forum. Game 4 was the longest in Memorial Cup history, lasting into five periods. Niagara Falls defeated Estevan in a best-of-seven series in five games.

Second Flyers
The Emms Family sold the Flyers in 1972 after it played for 12 seasons. The new owners then relocated the team to Sudbury to become the Sudbury Wolves.

Later the same year, after selling the Flyers, the Emms family bought the St. Catharines Black Hawks team who were the OHA champions the previous year. Four years after buying the Black Hawks, the Emms family relocated them to Niagara Falls in 1976, taking the same name as the previous team. The Emms family later sold this version of the Flyers in 1978.

The second Flyers team played for 4 seasons in the Ontario Hockey Association from 1976 to 1980, and 2 years in the Ontario Hockey League from 1980 to 1982. The Flyers appeared in the OHA finals in 1979, losing to Peterborough. Niagara Falls lost its Flyers team a second time in 1982 when they moved to North Bay to become the Centennials, who have subsequently moved to Saginaw in 2002 to become the Saginaw Spirit.

Championships
The Niagara Falls Flyers are one of a few clubs to win multiple Memorial Cup championships. Also of note, the franchise were repeat champions in different home cities, of Barrie and Niagara Falls. In total, the Flyers won the Memorial Cup twice in Niagara Falls, and twice in Barrie. and the J. Ross Robertson Cup 3 times each in Barrie and Niagara Falls. The Flyers finished first overall in 1963 & 1965 during the regular season to win the Hamilton Spectator Trophy. The second Niagara Falls Flyers team won the western conference Emms Trophy in the 1978–79 playoffs.

Memorial Cup
 1963 Lost to Edmonton Oil Kings
 1965 Champions vs. Edmonton Oil Kings
 1968 Champions vs. Estevan Bruins
George Richardson Memorial Trophy
 1963 Champions vs. Espanola Eagles
 1965 Champions vs. Lachine Maroons
 1968 Champions vs. Verdun Maple Leafs

J. Ross Robertson Cup
 1963 Champions vs. Neil McNeil Maroons
 1965 Champions vs. Toronto Marlboros
 1968 Champions vs. Kitchener Rangers
 1979 Lost to Peterborough Petes
Hamilton Spectator Trophy
1962–63 (69pts) and 1964–65 (81pts)
Emms Trophy
1978–79 (Western Conference)

Coaches
The Flyers from 1960 to 1972 were coached by Hap Emms, Bill Long and Paul Emms. The Flyers coaches from 1976 to 1982 are listed below.
1976–78: Paul Emms (2)
1978–79: Bert Templeton (2)
1979–80: Barry Boughner, F.Stanfield
1980–81: Paul Gauthier
1981–82: Bert Templeton (2)

Players
A combined total of 82 players from the Niagara Falls Flyers franchises went on to play in the National Hockey League, and two of those are enshrined in the Hockey Hall of Fame.

Award winners
1962–63 - Wayne Maxner, Red Tilson Trophy (Most Outstanding Player), Eddie Powers Memorial Trophy (Scoring Champion)
1963–64 - Bernie Parent, Dave Pinkney Trophy (Lowest Team GAA)
1964–65 - Bernie Parent, Dave Pinkney Trophy
1966–67 - Derek Sanderson, Eddie Powers Memorial Trophy
1967–68 - Tom Webster, Eddie Powers Memorial Trophy, William Hanley Trophy (Most Sportsmanlike Player)
1976–77 - Mike Gartner, Emms Family Award (Rookie of the Year)
1978–79 - Nick Ricci, F. W. "Dinty" Moore Trophy (Best Rookie GAA)
1981–82 - Ron Meighan, Max Kaminsky Trophy (Most Outstanding Defenceman)

Hall of Famers
Bernie Parent (1963–1965)
Mike Gartner (1976–1979)

NHL alumni
1960 to 1972

1976 to 1982

Yearly results

Regular season 1960–72

Playoffs
1960–61 Lost to Guelph Royals 10 points to 4 in quarter-finals.
1961–62 Lost to Hamilton Red Wings 8 points to 0 in OHA semi-finals.
1962–63 Defeated Hamilton Red Wings 8 points to 2 in OHA semi-finals. Defeated Montreal Junior Canadiens 8 points to 0 in OHA finals. Defeated Toronto Neil McNeil Maroons in all-Ontario finals. OHA CHAMPIONS Defeated Espanola Eagles in Richardson Trophy playoffs. Lost to Edmonton Oil Kings in Memorial Cup finals.
1963–64 Lost to Toronto Marlboros 8 points to 0 in quarter-finals.
1964–65 Defeated Oshawa Generals 8 points to 4 in quarter-finals. Received second-round bye. Defeated Toronto Marlboros 8 points to 2 in finals. OHA CHAMPIONS Defeated Edmonton Oil Kings in Memorial Cup finals. MEMORIAL CUP CHAMPIONS
1965–66 Lost to Kitchener Rangers 8 points to 4 in quarter-finals.
1966–67 Defeated London Knights 8 points to 4 in quarter-finals. Lost to Hamilton Red Wings 8 points to 6 in semi-finals.
1967–68 Defeated Peterborough Petes 8 points to 2 in quarter-finals. Defeated Montreal Junior Canadiens 8 points to 4 in semi-finals. Defeated Kitchener Rangers 9 points to 7 in finals. OHA CHAMPIONS Defeated Verdun Maple Leafs in Richardson Trophy playoffs. Defeated Estevan Bruins in Memorial Cup finals. MEMORIAL CUP CHAMPIONS
1968–69 Defeated Ottawa 67's 9 points to 5 in quarter-finals. Lost to St. Catharines Black Hawks 8 points to 6 in semi-finals.
1969–70 Out of playoffs.
1970–71 Out of playoffs.
1971–72 Lost to Oshawa Generals 8 points to 4 in quarter-finals.

Regular season 1976–82

Playoffs
1976–77 Out of playoffs.
1977–78 Out of playoffs.
1978–79 Defeated Kitchener Rangers 8 points to 6 in quarter-finals. Defeated Windsor Spitfires and London Knights in a semi-final round-robin. Lost to Peterborough Petes 8 points to 6 in finals.
1979–80 Defeated London Knights 3 games to 2 in first round. Lost to Windsor Spitfites 4 games to 1 in quarter-finals.
1980–81 Defeated Toronto Marlboros 3 games to 2 in division quarter-finals. Lost to Kitchener Rangers 9 points to 5 in quarter-finals.
1981–82 Lost to Windsor Spitfires 6 points to 4 in first round.

Arena
The Niagara Falls Flyers played home games at Niagara Falls Memorial Arena from 1960 to 1972, and again from 1976 to 1982. The arena hosted Memorial Cup games in 1968.

References

External links
Niagara Falls Memorial Arena - The OHL Arena & Travel Guide

Defunct Ontario Hockey League teams
Sport in Niagara Falls, Ontario